The Federal Convention, also known as the Federal Assembly, is, together with the Joint Committee, one of two non-standing constitutional bodies in the federal institutional system of the Federal Republic of Germany. It is convened solely for the purpose of electing the President of Germany, either every five years (no later than 30 days before the expiration of a sitting President's term) or within 30 days of the premature termination of a presidential term. The Federal Convention consists of all members of the German federal parliament (Bundestag) and the same number of delegates from the 16 federated states. Those delegates are elected by the state parliaments for this purpose only.

The Basic Law mandates that a maximum of three rounds of voting can be held. On the first two rounds, a candidate must receive an absolute majority of delegates to be elected. After that, in the third round, a plurality of all delegates voting is sufficient for election to the office of Federal President. Any member of the convention may nominate candidates. 

Usually there is not much uncertainty about the outcome: the party affiliations of the members of the convention, and hence the strength of the single parties, are known already. In many cases, the coalition in the federal parliament presented a joint candidate who prevailed in the first round.

Convening the Bundesversammlung
Each Federal Convention is convened by the incumbent President of the Bundestag in due course. Normally, this takes place during the last months of a sitting President's current term of office. The Convention must meet no later than thirty days before the end of the term, with the state parliaments needing sufficient time between the convening and the meeting to elect state electors.

If the term of office of a President ends prematurely through resignation or death, the Federal Convention must meet within thirty days. This has happened twice so far (2010 and 2012); in both cases, the President of the Bundestag convened the Assembly at the latest possible date.

Procedure
According to the Grundgesetz, the President is elected without a debate at the Federal Convention. The candidates are usually nominated by one or more parties but do not generally run a campaign. Each member of the Bundesversammlung may suggest candidates for the office of the Federal President. This means that not only parliamentary groups from the Bundestag can present a candidate but also small parties which may not be represented in the Bundestag. The Bundesversammlung is chaired by the President of the Bundestag (or one of the Vice Presidents, if the President stands as a candidate – as was the case with Karl Carstens in 1979).

The procedure of the election of the Bundespräsident consists of a maximum of three secret votes by written ballot. If one of the first two votes ends with an absolute majority for one of the candidates, this candidate is elected immediately. If the first two votes do not lead to an absolute majority, a plurality is sufficient on the third and final vote. The President of the Bundestag closes the session of the Bundesversammlung once the elected candidate accepts. Thus, the convention is irrevocably dissolved until it is reconvened for the next election. This means that even if the elected president were to resign only a few hours after accepting the election, the convention could not simply reconvene; rather, the president of the Bundestag would have to call a new convention, for which the state parliaments would first have to elect electors again.

Normally, the new president takes office thirty days after the election at the earliest, as the term of office of the predecessor is still continuing. Only in the case of a vacancy (e.g. after the resignation of the predecessor, as happened in 2010 and 2012), the elected person takes office immediately upon acceptance of the election. Irrespective of this, a newly elected president does not take the oath of office before the Federal Convention, but after taking office in a joint session of the Bundestag and the Bundesrat.

Membership
The Bundesversammlung includes the entire membership of the Bundestag, and an equal number of state delegates elected by the state or 'Länder' parliaments specifically for this purpose, proportional to their population. 

According to federal law, every member of a state parliament has one vote. The delegates are elected with lists and proportional vote. Some details are dealt with by the standing orders of the state parliament. In many state parliaments, the members vote on a joint list that mirrors the strengths of the parliamentary groups.

A delegate for the Federal Convention must meet one certain standard: they must also be eligible for a candidacy for the Bundestag. The parliamentary groups sometimes elect delegates who are not politicians. For example, they choose artists, sports persons or other celebrities, or occasionally an ordinary citizen with an unusual story. Examples from 2017 are Jogi Löw, the coach of the national football team, for the Green Party in Baden-Württemberg and Olivia Jones, Germany's most famous drag queen, for the Green Party in Lower Saxony. Semiya Şimşek, daughter of a NSU terror victim, was elected by Die Linke in Thuringia.

The idea behind this custom is to have the president be elected not only by politicians but by a broader segment of the population. Also, the political parties like to be associated with the celebrities. They expect these non-politicians to vote within party lines. The voting in the Federal Convention is secret. From the time of their nomination until the closing of the session of the Federal Convention its members enjoy parliamentary immunity with regard to prosecution by public authorities in very much the same way as members of the Bundestag do.

History

Since 1979, the Bundesversammlung has traditionally met on May 23, the anniversary of the Basic Law (1949). This has changed since the resignations of former presidents Horst Koehler and Christian Wulff.

The most recent assembly of the Bundesversammlung was held on 13 February 2022, where Frank-Walter Steinmeier was re-elected.

Venue
On 12 September 1949, the first Bundesversammlung met in Bonn, which served as the capital of the Federal Republic of Germany before reunification with East Germany. From 1954 to 1969 the Bundesversammlung was convened at the Ostpreußenhalle in Berlin, leading to protests from the German Democratic Republic on each occasion it met. As a consequence, on March 5, 1969, the Soviet Union sent MiG-21 warplanes to fly over the venue in West Berlin. From 1974 to 1989, the Bundesversammlung met in the Beethovenhalle in Bonn. Since 1994, the meeting place has been the Reichstag building in Berlin. After the renovation of the Reichstag, the German Bundestag moved to the building in April 1999. Since the meeting of the Bundesversammlung held in May 1999, the body has convened in the plenary chamber at the Reichstag building, except that the 2022 Bundesversammlung took place at the Paul-Löbe-Haus in Berlin, with delegates spread over several floors, due to the COVID-19 pandemic.

See also
 Politics of Germany
 Federalism in Germany
 Federal Assembly of Austria
 Federal Assembly of Switzerland

External links
 Distribution of seats in the Bundesversammlung
 Election of the Federal President
 Article 54 – Basic Law for the Federal Republic of Germany (Grundgesetz, GG)
 Law on the Election of the President by the Federal Assembly (German)

Notes

References

Government of Germany
Electoral colleges